The RN-2 National Highway is a national highway in Djibouti.

Roads in Djibouti